Ventura is the third album by Brazilian band Los Hermanos, released in 2003. It was the first work of a Brazilian band to be made available - illegally - on the Internet before its official release.

It was considered by the Brazilian edition of Rolling Stone as the 68th greatest Brazilian album. In September 2012, it was elected by the audience of Radio Eldorado FM, of Estadao.com e of Caderno C2+Música (both the latter belong to newspaper O Estado de S. Paulo) as the best Brazilian album ever.

Ventura was certified gold by the Brazilian Association of Record Producers (50,000 copies). When the album was ready to be delivered, the band was met with Abril Music's bankruptcy in late 2002. Los Hermanos received offers from independent labels, such as Trama and Deckdisc, however, the band secured a deal with BMG, which bought part of the catalog and brought the band as their artist, alongside bands such as Capital Inicial e Titãs.

Track listing

Personnel 
Marcelo Camelo – Vocals, Guitar
Rodrigo Amarante – Vocals, Guitar
Rodrigo Barba – Drums
Bruno Medina – Musical keyboard
Alexandre Kassin – Producer, Bass

Additional musicians 
Gabriel Bubu – Bass, Guitar
Pepe Cisneros – Clave, Cowbell, Congas, Bongô
Stephane San Juan – Chocalho
Eduardo Morelenbaum – Clarinet
Eliezer Rodrigues – Tuba
Bubu – Trumpet
Jessé Sadoc – Trumpet, Flugelhorn
Mauro Zacharias – Trombone
Serginho Trombone – Trombone
Índio – Baritone Saxophone
Zé Canuto – Baritone Saxophone

Certifications

References

Los Hermanos albums
2003 albums